Bloomingdale is an unincorporated community located in Robeson County in the State of North Carolina,  United States. It is located at latitude 34°26'26" North, longitude 79°1'14" West.

Unincorporated communities in Robeson County, North Carolina
Unincorporated communities in North Carolina